Hoseynabad-e Emami (also Romanized as Ḩoseynābād-e Emāmī; also known as Deh-e Now, Deh-i-Nan, Deh-i-Nau, Deh Now, Hosein Abad Deh Now, Ḩoseynābād, and Ḩoseynābād-e Deh Now) is a village in Bahreman Rural District, Nuq District, Rafsanjan County, Kerman Province, Iran. At the 2006 census, its population was 36, in 8 families.

References 

Populated places in Rafsanjan County